Brown Mountain is a small cinder cone on top of a shield volcano located in Cascade Volcanic Arc in Klamath and Jackson counties, Oregon. Most of the mountain, including its peak, is in western Klamath County, but its western flanks trail off into eastern Jackson County.

Geology
Brown Mountain appears to be relatively young at first as its summit is unweathered and devoid of trees, however glacial valleys and a cirque near the summit prove that the mountain is actually twelve thousand to sixty thousand years old. Around two thousand years ago,

Access and trails
Brown Mountain can be accessed via Oregon Route 140, which passes just north of the peak. It can also be accessed through the Pacific Crest Trail, and the  Brown Mountain Trail.

Flora and fauna
The area at the base of the mountain is covered with old growth forests. The mountain is also home to animals such as Douglas squirrels and pikas. Toward the summit, the land is nearly devoid of vegetation.

References

External links
 
 

Shield volcanoes of the United States
Volcanoes of Oregon
Mountains of Klamath County, Oregon
Mountains of Jackson County, Oregon
Mountains of Oregon
Cinder cones of the United States
Landforms of Jackson County, Oregon
Volcanoes of Klamath County, Oregon
Pleistocene volcanoes